Charles Carroll (22 March 1723 – 23 March 1783) was an American statesman from Annapolis, Maryland. He was the builder of the Baltimore Colonial home Mount Clare (1760), and a delegate to the Second Continental Congress in 1776 and 1777.

Early life 
A descendant of the last Gaelic Lords of Éile in Ireland, Charles Carroll was born in Annapolis, Maryland of a distinguished Roman Catholic family and was a distant cousin of Charles Carroll of Carrollton, (1737–1832), and Daniel Carroll (the First and Second), (1730–1796). His father, also Charles Carroll, took him to Europe in 1733 for his education. Young Charles spent six years at the English House school in Lisbon, Portugal. He then went to England to complete his education at Eton and Cambridge. After graduating Cambridge in 1746, Charles returned to Annapolis. He took up residence there. He busied himself learning to manage the family's farm and mills at Carrollton.

In 1751 Charles decided on a more specific career. He journeyed to London, took up residence at the Middle Temple, and studied law. He was admitted to the bar at the Inns of Court there before returning to Maryland early in 1755. Since there were now three other relatives named Charles active in public affairs in the area, he began to call himself  Charles Carroll, Barrister. However, he never practiced law in the US.

Three months later his father died, leaving Charles, at 32, one of the wealthiest men in Maryland. He was elected to his father's seat for Anne Arundel County in the Maryland Assembly, legislature in Annapolis for the colony. 

In 1760 he completed construction of his summer home and estate at "Georgia Plantation", southwest of Baltimore along the Georgetown Road, also known as the Columbia Road (later Washington Boulevard, (U.S. Route 1) in modern Carroll Park and north of the Gwynns Falls stream which flows into the Middle Branch ("Ridgeley's Cove") and Ferry Branch of the Patapsco River. He named the home "Mount Clare" after his grandmother. In June 1763 Charles married, to Margaret Tilghman (1742–1817), daughter of Matthew Tilghman of Talbot County. Although the couple had no children who reached maturity, they remained together until his death. She became the mistress of Mount Clare, and earned a reputation for her greenhouse and pinery, where she grew oranges, lemons, and pineapple.

Revolutionary years 
Carroll continued in the Assembly until it was prorogued at the beginning of the Revolution, and then met with other leaders in the Annapolis Convention and had important roles in all their sessions. He joined the Committee of Correspondence in 1774, and the Committee of Safety in 1775. He presided over several sessions of the Convention, which was the early revolutionary government in Maryland. 

Charles was one of the committee of the convention that drafted the  "Declaration and Charter of Rights and form of government for the state of Maryland" which served as Maryland's first new constitution after it was adopted on 3 November 1776. When the convention voted to expel the 23rd proprietary governor and last royal governor, Sir Robert Eden, 1st Baronet, of Maryland, he delivered the message as the chairman of the Convention. Then, in an action typical of his style, he entertained the governor and his wife as house guests at Mount Clare Mansion until they sailed for England.

Later in November 1776, the Convention sent Carroll as a delegate to the Continental Congress to replace his cousin, Charles Carroll of Carrollton. He served in that Congress until 15 February 1777. He declined the position of Chief Justice in the new revolutionary confederation government. But when he returned, he was elected to the first state Senate in 1777. Later he was re-elected and served in that office until his death, on 23 March 1783, at Mount Clare Mansion. His funeral was held at Old St. Paul's Anglican Church (now Episcopal since 1789) in Baltimore at North Charles and East Saratoga Streets.  He was buried there (small cemetery surrounding original church, later moved to block between West Baltimore and Lombard Streets-bounded by new Martin Luther King Boulevard) but later his body was moved to St. Anne's Churchyard (Anglican/Episcopal) off Church Circle in Annapolis.

Mount Clare and other 

In the early 1760s, Carroll took the lead and encouraged a group of his business associates to build a fund for a young saddler, Charles Willson Peale, so that he could go to Europe and study painting.

After Charles' death, his wife Margaret stayed at Mount Clare until her death there on 14 March 1817.  Mansion and grounds had many uses and owners during the later 19th Century.   Their home today is a museum, (both for its architecture, furniture and decorations plus history of the plantation and family) operated since 1917 by the National Society of the Colonial Dames in the State of Maryland, on behalf of the owner which is the City of Baltimore and its Department of Recreation and Parks. The core of the home is the refurbished main block. The wings, which had been lost over the years, were rebuilt in 1908. A great deal of the family furniture and possessions are preserved there. The home is a fine example of Georgian architecture, and stands on a rise in the center of Carroll Park in southwest Baltimore City, surrounded by the neighborhoods of "Pigtown", also known by its more recent "gentrified" name of Washington Village. Mount Clare Museum House is open to the public year-round.

See also
Carroll family

References

Further reading 
Ronald Hoffman; "Princes of Ireland, Planters of Maryland: A Carroll Saga, 1500–1782"; 2000, University of North Carolina Press, ; (2002, paperback).
Michael Trostel; "Mount Clare, Being an Account of the Seat Built by Charles Carroll etc."; Baltimore, 1981, Colonial Dames of Maryland.

External links 

The Mount Clare Museum's web site

1723 births
1783 deaths
Continental Congressmen from Maryland
18th-century American politicians
Politicians from Annapolis, Maryland
Charles
American people of Irish descent
Alumni of Clare College, Cambridge
Maryland state senators
People educated at Eton College
Tilghman family
English barristers